The 1893 Geneva Covenanters football team was an American football team that represented Geneva College as an independent during the 1893 college football season. Led by fourth-year head coach William McCracken, Geneva compiled a record of 2–2–1.

Schedule

References

Geneva
Geneva Golden Tornadoes football seasons
Geneva Covenanters football